Khitan or Khitai may refer to:
Khitan (circumcision), the Islamic circumcision rite
Khitan people, an ancient nomadic people located in Mongolia and northern China
Liao dynasty (916–1125), a dynasty of China ruled by the Khitan Yelü clan
Northern Liao (1122–1123), a regime in northern China
Qara Khitai (1124–1218), alternatively called the "Western Liao", successor to the Liao dynasty in northwestern China and Central Asia
Eastern Liao (1213–1269), a regime in northeastern China
Later Liao (1216–1219), a regime in northeastern China
Khitan language, a now-extinct language once spoken by the Khitan people
Khitan scripts (disambiguation), writing systems of the Khitan people, for the now-extinct Khitan language
Khitan large script, a logographic writing system
Khitan small script, a semi-syllabic and logographic writing system
Cathay in many languages

Language and nationality disambiguation pages